Marne is a village in the province of Bergamo in Italy. It is a frazione of the comune of Filago.

History

The village became part of Brembate di Sotto on the order of Napoleon. Filago decided to annex the village during the Fascist period; it did not, however, officially become part of Filago until after the formation of the Italian Republic in 1946.

Main sights
 Saint Bartholomew Parish Church, 12th century

Notable people

 Maurizio Malvestiti, (born 1953) bishop of Lodi, born in Marne

References 

Cities and towns in Lombardy
Frazioni of the Province of Bergamo